Even on the Worst Nights is an album by Ohio-based pop punk band Mixtapes.

Background
As the debut full length album for the band, songs cover a range of familiar topics including love, loneliness, and appreciation for Superchunk.

Track listing

Personnel
Ryan Rockwell – vocals, guitar, keyboard
Maura Weaver – vocals, guitar
Michael Remley – bass
Boone Haley – drums

References

2012 albums
No Sleep Records albums